Alexandros Kefalas (born 21 December 1984) is a Greek skeleton racer. He is a participant at the 2014 Winter Olympics in Sochi. He carried Greece's flag at the closing ceremony.

References

1984 births
Living people
Greek male skeleton racers
Skeleton racers at the 2014 Winter Olympics
Olympic skeleton racers of Greece
20th-century Greek people
21st-century Greek people